Gjermund Åsen (born 22 May 1991) is a Norwegian professional footballer who plays as a midfielder for Lillestrøm.

Club career
Åsen joined Rosenborg BK from Strindheim before the 2010 season. He made his Rosenborg debut 7 March 2010 in the Norwegian Superfinalen against Aalesund, and made his league debut for Rosenborg in the first league game of the 2010 season against Molde on 14 March 2010.

Åsen was on two short loan-spells at Ranheim in 2011 and 2012, but transferred to Ranheim after his second loan-spell on 1 August 2012. 

On 22 January 2019, Åsen returned to Rosenborg on a four-year contract. Falling out of favor, he was loaned out to Lillestrøm for the 2021 season with an option to buy. After the season, in which Åsen would record the most assists in the league with 12, Lillestrøm triggered the option to buy and announced on 30 November 2021 that they had signed Åsen on a permanent deal through the 2023 season.

Career statistics

Club

Honours
Rosenborg
Norwegian Premier League Championship: 2010

Individual
Eliteserien Top assist provider: 2018, 2021

References

External links
 

1991 births
Living people
Footballers from Trondheim
Norwegian footballers
Association football midfielders
Eliteserien players
Norwegian First Division players
Strindheim IL players
Rosenborg BK players
Ranheim Fotball players
Tromsø IL players